Amelie Lens (born 31 May 1990) is a Belgian electronic music DJ, record producer, and owner of the Lenske record label. Her debut release came on Italian imprint Lyase, and soon after a trio of releases on Pan-Pot's Second State and a collab EP with Regal on Involve Records followed. As a resident at Hasselt's Labyrinth Club, Lens started curating her own nights under the name EXHALE. Lens has expanded the EXHALE parties further afield, with regular showcases at the London's fabric club and at Creamfields, OFFSonar, Dour and Extrema festivals.

Early life
Amelie Lens was born as French in Vilvoorde. She changed her nationality to Belgian when she got older. Everyone from her mothers' side is from France and so is her grandmother who raised her. From an early age, she had a diverse interest in music, citing Nine Inch Nails, Underworld, Boys Noize and Ellen Allien as early influences. She became absorbed in electronic music at 16, after attending the 2006 Dour Festival in Belgium, an experience she describes as "life-changing". She says: "As soon as I got home, I started reading about the history of electronic music and discovered so many new artists and labels. It was like a whole new world opened for me; I made playlists in iTunes, putting tracks in an order that I liked, kind of like a podcast but not mixed.

Career
Lens gave up her work in the fashion industry in 2014, and  began to DJ  under the name Renée, playing mostly bass-heavy minimal techno, earning a residency at the Labyrinth Club in Hasselt, Belgium, where she built enough of a reputation to tour across Europe. More recently her high energy sets are known for their mixture of classic acid and tribal house influences along with more contemporary European techno sounds.

Musical sound and equipment
She often plays live using a Pioneer RMX 1000. Lens says she uses the effects box "to add layers to the mix. It has a built-in sampler and personalised effects that can entirely reform the playing track that is playing. Like everything, its use is situational. Sometimes I hardly touch it, but when I play a peak-time set it truly shines. I specifically look for and buy tracks that will work well with the device. Very stripped-down or minimalistic percussion locked grooves." While producing, Amelie uses Ableton Live DAW, as well as the Elektron Analog Four synth and sequencer.

Discography
 2016: Exhale
 2016: Let it Go (Second State)
 2017: Contradiction (Second State)  
 2017: Stay With Me  (Second State)
 2017: Nel (Elevate)
 2018: Amelie Lens & Farrago - Weight Of The Land (Arts)
 2018: Regal / Amelie Lens - INVOLVE 020 (Involve)
 2018: Basiel' (Lenske)
 2019: Teach Me (Amelie Lens Remixes) (Drumcode)
 2019: Hypnotized (Second State)
 2019: Look What Your Love Has Done To Me Remixed (Perc Trax)
 2019: Litte Robot (Lenske)
 2019: Fabric Presents Amelie Lens CD-mix compilation (Fabric)
 2020: Various - The Future (Lenske)
 2020: Higher (Lenske)
 2021: Amelie Lens & AIROD - Raver's Heart (Lenske)
 2022: In My Mind'' (Lenske)

References

External links
 

1990 births
Belgian record producers
Belgian techno music groups
Women DJs
Living people
Women in electronic music
Musicians from Antwerp
21st-century women musicians
Women record producers
Belgian DJs